The Lynch-O'Gorman House is a historic house at 41 Mason Terrace in Brookline, Massachusetts.  Design of this house has been attributed to Arthur Vinal, a prominent area architect; it is an elaborately-decorated Queen Anne Victorian that was built in 1889 by Charles Sias on Beacon Street.  It was moved to its present location on Mason Terrace in 1903.  The house features the typical high-style Queen Anne profusion of shapes and texture.

The house was listed on the National Register of Historic Places in 1985.

See also
National Register of Historic Places listings in Brookline, Massachusetts

References

Queen Anne architecture in Massachusetts
Houses completed in 1889
Houses in Brookline, Massachusetts
National Register of Historic Places in Brookline, Massachusetts
Houses on the National Register of Historic Places in Norfolk County, Massachusetts